Arcondo Nunatak is a nunatak,  high, standing  south of Mount Spann in the Panzarini Hills portion of the Argentina Range of the Pensacola Mountains of Antarctica. It was mapped by the United States Geological Survey from surveys and from U.S. Navy air photos, 1956–67, and named by the Advisory Committee on Antarctic Names for Mayor Pedro Arcondo, Argentine officer in charge at Belgrano I Base, 1959–61.

References

 

Nunataks of Queen Elizabeth Land